Y tu mamá también (Spanish for And Your Mother Too) is a 2001 Mexican road film directed by Alfonso Cuarón and co-written by him and his brother Carlos. It stars Mexican actors Diego Luna and Gael García Bernal and Spanish actress Maribel Verdú.

The film tells a coming-of-age story about two teenage boys who take a road trip with a woman in her late twenties. It is set in 1999 against the backdrop of Mexico's political and economic realities, specifically at the end of the uninterrupted seven decades of presidents from the Institutional Revolutionary Party and the rise of the opposition led by Vicente Fox.

The film's explicit depiction of sex, nudity, and drug use caused complications in the film's rating. However, in Mexico, the film earned $2.2 million its first weekend in June 2001, setting a new record for the highest box office opening in Mexican cinema. In 2002, the film was released in English-speaking markets under its Spanish title, with a limited release in the United States. The film received critical acclaim and was nominated for Best Original Screenplay at the Academy Awards and as Best Foreign Language Film at the Golden Globe Awards.

Plot 
The film opens with "two teenage best friends", working-class Julio and upper-class Tenoch—each having sex with their respective girlfriends before the girls depart on a trip to Italy. Without their girlfriends around, the boys take the opportunity to live as bachelors.

At a wedding, they meet Luisa, the Spanish wife of Tenoch's cousin, Jano. Trying to impress Luisa, the boys talk about a fictitious, secluded beach called Boca del Cielo ("Heaven's Mouth"); however, she initially declines their invitation to accompany them there. Later, Luisa visits a doctor; after her appointment, she receives a phone call from a drunken Jano, who tearfully confesses that he cheated on her. The next day, Luisa calls Tenoch and asks if their offer to accompany them to the beach is still open.

Although Julio and Tenoch have little idea where they will actually go, the three set off, driving through rural Mexico. They talk about their relationships and sexual experiences to pass the time: the boys boast about their exploits, while Luisa speaks of Jano and recalls her first love, who died in a motorcycle accident.

During an overnight stop, Luisa leaves a tearful message on Jano's answering machine explaining that she has left him. Tenoch enters her motel room in search of shampoo but finds her crying. Luisa seduces him, and the two have sex. Julio sees them through the open door and walks away, upset. Afterward, Julio tells Tenoch he had sex with Tenoch's girlfriend. The next day, Luisa notices the tension between the boys, so she has sex with Julio to equalize their perceived status. An upset Tenoch then reveals that he has had sex with Julio's girlfriend. Julio and Tenoch begin fighting, but stop when Luisa threatens to leave them.

Driving along the coastal road that evening, they chance upon an isolated beach that is actually called Boca del Cielo. Making camp there, they begin to relax and enjoy the ocean, along with the company of a local family. After their campsite is ransacked by a herd of pigs, they spend the night in the nearby village, where Luisa makes another phone call to Jano, bidding him an affectionate but final farewell.

That evening, Luisa, Julio, and Tenoch get drunk and joke about their sexual transgressions. Julio and Tenoch reveal that they each have frequently had sex with the other's girlfriend. Julio adds that he had sex with Tenoch's mother, but it is unclear whether he is serious. The three dance together sensually and then retire to their room. As Luisa kneels between the boys and stimulates them both, the boys embrace and kiss each other passionately.

The next morning, the boys wake up together, naked. Tenoch goes outside to vomit, and the boys are eager to return home. The narrator explains that their journey back was quiet and uneventful, and that Luisa stayed behind to explore the nearby coves. The narrator states that the boys' girlfriends broke up with them, and Tenoch and Julio also stopped hanging out.

A year later, in a chance encounter in Mexico City, Tenoch and Julio have a cup of coffee. They awkwardly catch up on each other's lives and news of their mutual friends. Tenoch informs Julio that Luisa died of cancer a month after their trip, and that she had been aware of her prognosis during the time they had spent together. Tenoch excuses himself because his current girlfriend is waiting for him. Before leaving, Tenoch tells Julio he will see him later; however, the narrator reveals that they will never see each other again.

Cast 
 Maribel Verdú as Luisa Cortés
 Gael García Bernal as Julio Zapata
 Diego Luna as Tenoch Iturbide
 Diana Bracho as Silvia Allende de Iturbide
 Andrés Almeida as Diego "Saba" Madero
 Ana López Mercado as Ana Morelos
 Nathan Grinberg as Manuel Huerta
 Verónica Langer as María Eugenia Calles de Huerta
 María Aura as Cecilia Huerta
 Juan Carlos Remolina as Alejandro "Jano" Montes de Oca
 Daniel Giménez Cacho as Narrator

Cuarón did not want to cast Luna for the role of Tenoch because he was a teen idol and telenovela star in Mexico. García Bernal convinced Cuarón to hire Luna because their friendship would make the performance of their characters' friendship much easier.  Cuarón ultimately hired Luna because he became convinced that their bond would produce a natural and honest performance.

Production

Development 
After working on Great Expectations and A Little Princess, Alfonso Cuarón envisioned a film that was not influenced by production techniques used in Hollywood cinema. Cuarón wanted to reject commercial production techniques he had used in his previous films, like dollies, close-ups, and dissolves. Instead he embraced a documentary-realist style of filmmaking for Y tu mamá también. Before making the film, Cuarón had worked for some time in Hollywood, prior to return to his roots in Mexican cinema. In an interview, Cuarón said: "I wanted to make the film I was going to make before I went to film school, ...a film in Spanish, and a road movie involving a journey to the beach."

Additionally, Cuarón has cited Adieu Philippine, a 1962 French New Wave film, as a crucial inspiration for Y tu mamá también. Overlaps include a road trip featuring a love triangle, wide shots of a car curving down a road, an omniscient narrator, and a character dancing while staring into the camera.

Road movie 
In Y tu mamá también, Alfonso Cuarón reimagined the American road movie genre to depict Mexico's geography, politics, people, and culture. Cuarón wanted to use the road-film genre to challenge mid-20th century Latin-American Cinema movements that rejected the pleasure and entertainment typical of Hollywood commercial cinema created by using fictional characters and story. Cuarón aimed to only borrow the pleasure and entertainment of Hollywood cinema to synthesize with political and cultural exploration of Mexico. Using fictional characters and a story within the documentary-realist style, Cuarón was able to explore Mexico's geographical, cultural, and political landscapes.

Filming and production 
The director and screenwriter were not afraid of developing Y tu mamá también during the production process. Cuarón's script was minimal and unelaborate so the actors could contribute to its development during the rehearsal process. Throughout the film the actors improvised. Instead of using high-tech equipment, the entire film was shot with a handheld camera to create a documentary-realist look that mimicked candid footage. In an interview, Cuarón said it all went "back to our original idea of 15 years ago, in which we would do a low-budget road movie that would allow us to go with some young actors and semi-improvise scenes and have a bare storyline but not be afraid of adding things as we went."

Locations 
The beach scenes in the film were shot near the resort Bahías de Huatulco in Oaxaca.

Home media 
Y tu mama tambien was released on VHS in 2003 by Paramount Home Entertainment, and DVD in 2004 by Metro-Goldwyn-Mayer on MGM DVD, and also on DVD in 2006 by Paramount Home Entertainment and released on Blu-ray in 2012 by Paramount Pictures. The film was later released as part of The Criterion Collection.

Soundtrack

Distribution and finance 
Y tu mamá también was produced by Anhelo Producciones, a company co-founded by Cuarón and Jorge Vergara, a well-known Mexican businessman and the film's producer. The company provided sufficient funding to make the film and launch an impressive marketing campaign. The $5 million film budget was substantial by Mexican film standards. Advertisement and publicity appeared across Mexico. Along with the help of Anhelo Producciones, the ratings board controversy gave the film a lot of free publicity in Mexico. On location production support was provided by Alianza Films International. The film was distributed in Mexico by 20th Century Fox. Shortly after the Mexican release, IFC Films acquired North American distribution rights to the film.

It was released without a rating in the US because a market-limiting NC-17 was unavoidable. The MPAA's presumed treatment of the film based on the graphic depiction of sex, nudity and drug use in comparison to its much more accepting standards regarding violence, prompted critic Roger Ebert to question why movie industry professionals were not outraged: "Why do serious film people not rise up in rage and tear down the rating system that infantilizes their work?"

Reception 

A box office success both domestically and abroad, Y tu mamá también grossed $2.2 million in its first week, breaking Mexico's box office records for domestic films. It went on to gross a record $12 million in Mexico.

The film became a global success after its distribution by U.S. independent companies Good Machine and IFC Films. The film grossed $13.8 million in the US and Canada, making it the second-highest grossing Spanish language film in the United States at the time, and poised Bernal for crossover success into American markets (Bernal's 2004 performance in The Motorcycle Diaries would go on to break this record). It grossed $33.6 million worldwide.

Critically, Y tu mamá también garnered acclaim upon its original release. The review aggregator website Rotten Tomatoes reported that 92% of critics gave the film positive reviews, based upon a sample of 138, and an average rating of 8.10/10. The website's critical consensus states, "A road movie that's not only sexy, but intelligent as well". On Metacritic, which assigns a numbered rating out of 100 based on reviews from mainstream critics, the film received an average score of 89/100 based on 36 reviews, indicating "universal acclaim". Roger Ebert gave the film four stars out of four, saying, "Beneath the carefree road movie that the movie is happy to advertise is a more serious level—and below that, a dead serious level."

Y tu mamá también won the Best Screenplay Award at the Venice Film Festival. It was also a runner up at the National Society of Film Critics Awards for Best Picture and Best Director and earned a nomination for Best Original Screenplay at the 2003 Academy Awards. The film made its US premiere at the Hawaii International Film Festival.

Censorship controversy 

In 2001, Alfonso and Carlos Cuarón sued the Mexican Directorate of Radio, Television, and Cinema (RTC) for the film's 18+ rating (A grade ‘C’ certificate from the RTC), which they considered illegal political censorship. They took legal action to expose the government-controlled ratings board, prompting its transformation into an autonomous organization free of government involvement and political influence. The 18+ rating was administered for strong sexual content, nudity involving teens, drug use, and explicit language, and prevented audiences under 18 from admittance. They claimed the ratings board was operating illegally by denying parents the responsibility to choose what their child can watch, violating fundamental legal rights in Mexico.

Awards

Accolades 
 Ranked No. 20 in Empire magazine's 100 Best Films Of World Cinema
 Ranked No. 9 in Los Angeles Film Critics Association's Films of the Decade
 The New York Timess Best 1,000 Movies Ever Made
 Entertainment Weeklys 25 Sexiest Movies Ever!

References

External links 

 
 
 
 
 

2001 films
2000s Spanish-language films
2001 drama films
2001 independent films
2001 LGBT-related films
2000s coming-of-age drama films
2000s drama road movies
2000s erotic drama films
Films directed by Alfonso Cuarón
Films produced by Alfonso Cuarón
Films set in 1999
Films set in 2000
Films set in Mexico
Films shot in Mexico
Films with screenplays by Alfonso Cuarón
IFC Films films
Independent Spirit Award for Best Foreign Film winners
LGBT-related coming-of-age films
LGBT-related drama films
Male bisexuality in film
Mexican coming-of-age drama films
Mexican erotic drama films
Mexican independent films
Mexican LGBT-related films
2000s Mexican films